The ANIEF is a national trade union centre in Palermo, Italy.

President
 Marcello Pacifico (2003- )

References

External links
Anief